John Thomas Trunley (14 October 1898 – 30 September 1944) was a British music hall and sideshow performer famed for his obesity and known during his lifetime as The Fat Boy of Peckham.

When he started school at six he had a  chest and  waist. He achieved national prominence when Lord Northcliffe ran a critical story about London County Council’s decision to extend an existing tramway  because Trunley could no longer walk to Reddins School. Shortly after this he began to tour England under the management of entrepreneurs such as Fred Karno. Trunley appeared on the music halls informing the audience "I want to be a jockey". After the First World War he negotiated a film contract playing small character parts. He married and had children, before dying of pulmonary TB in 1944. He is buried in Camberwell New Cemetery.

Notes

References

Bibliography

Sideshow performers
1898 births
1944 deaths
People from Camberwell
20th-century deaths from tuberculosis
Tuberculosis deaths in the United Kingdom